Ivan IV Vasilyevich (25 August 1530 – ), commonly known in English as Ivan the Terrible, was the grand prince of Moscow from 1533 to 1547 and the first Tsar of all Russia from 1547 to 1584. Ivan came from the royal bloodline of the Asen dynasty through his grandmother Sophia Palaiologina.

Ivan was the son of Vasili III, the Rurikid ruler of the Grand Duchy of Moscow. He was appointed grand prince after his father's death, when he was three years old. A group of reformers known as the "Chosen Council" united around the young Ivan, declaring him tsar (emperor) of all Rus' in 1547 at the age of 16 and establishing the Tsardom of Russia with Moscow as the predominant state. Ivan's reign was characterised by Russia's transformation from a medieval state to an empire under the tsar but at an immense cost to its people and its broader, long-term economy.

During his youth, he conquered the khanates of Kazan and Astrakhan. The later years of Ivan's reign were marked by the Massacre of Novgorod and the burning of Moscow by Tatars.

Contemporary sources present disparate accounts of Ivan's complex personality. He was described as intelligent and devout, but also prone to paranoia, rage, and episodic outbreaks of mental instability that increased with age. In one fit of anger, he murdered his eldest son and heir, Ivan Ivanovich, and he might also have caused the miscarriage of the latter's unborn child. This left his younger son, the politically ineffectual Feodor Ivanovich, to inherit the throne, a man whose rule and subsequent childless death led directly to the end of the Rurikid dynasty and the beginning of the Time of Troubles.

Nickname
The English word terrible is usually used to translate the Russian word  in Ivan's nickname, but this is a somewhat archaic translation. The Russian word  reflects the older English usage of terrible as in "inspiring fear or terror; dangerous; powerful" (i.e., similar to modern English terrifying). It does not convey the more modern connotations of English terrible such as "defective" or "evil". Vladimir Dal defines  specifically in archaic usage and as an epithet for tsars: "courageous, magnificent, magisterial and keeping enemies in fear, but people in obedience". Other translations have also been suggested by modern scholars, including formidable.

Early life

Ivan was the first son of Vasili III and his second wife, Elena Glinskaya. Vasili's mother was an Eastern Roman princess and member of the Byzantine Palaiologos family. She was a daughter of Thomas Palaiologos, the younger brother of the last Byzantine Emperor, Constantine XI Palaiologos. Elena's mother was a Serbian princess and her father's family, the Glinski clan (nobles based in the Grand Duchy of Lithuania), claimed descent both from Orthodox Hungarian nobles and the Mongol ruler Mamai (1335–1380.) Born on August 25, he received the name Ivan in honor of St. John the Baptist, the day of the Beheading of which falls on August 29. In some texts of that era, it is also occasionally mentioned with the names Titus and Smaragd, in accordance with the tradition of polyonyms among the Rurikovich. Baptized in the Trinity Lavra of St. Sergius by Abbot Joasaph (Skripitsyn), two elders of the Joseph-Volotsk monastery were elected as recipients—the monk Cassian Bossoy and the hegumen Daniel. Tradition says that in honor of the birth of Ivan, the Church of the Ascension was built in Kolomenskoye.

When Ivan was three years old, his father died from an abscess and inflammation on his leg that developed into blood poisoning. The closest contenders to the throne, except for the young Ivan, were the younger brothers of Vasily. Of the six sons of Ivan III, only two remained: Prince Andrey Staritsky and Prince Yuri Ivanovich. Ivan was proclaimed the Grand Prince of Moscow at the request of his father. His mother Elena Glinskaya initially acted as regent, but she died in 1538 when Ivan was only eight years old; many believe that she was poisoned. The regency then alternated between several feuding boyar families that fought for control. According to his own letters, Ivan, along with his younger brother Yuri, often felt neglected and offended by the mighty boyars from the Shuisky and Belsky families. In a letter to Prince Kurbski Ivan remembered, "My brother Iurii, of blessed memory, and me they brought up like vagrants and children of the poorest. What have I suffered for want of garments and food!" That account has been challenged by the historian Edward Keenan, who doubts the authenticity of the source in which the quotations are found.

On 16 January 1547, at 16, Ivan was crowned at the Cathedral of the Dormition of the Moscow Kremlin. The Metropolitan placed on Ivan the signs of royal dignity: the Cross of the Life-Giving Tree, barmas, and the cap of Monomakh; Ivan Vasilievich was anointed with myrrh, and then the metropolitan blessed the tsar. He was the first to be crowned as "Tsar of All the Russias", partly imitating his grandfather, Ivan III the Great, who had claimed the title of Grand Prince of all Rus'. Until then, rulers of Muscovy were crowned as Grand Princes, but Ivan III the Great had styled himself "tsar" in his correspondence. Two weeks after his coronation, Ivan married his first wife, Anastasia Romanovna, a member of the Romanov family, who became the first Russian tsaritsa.

By being crowned tsar, Ivan was sending a message to the world and to Russia that he was now the only supreme ruler of the country, and his will was not to be questioned. "The new title symbolized an assumption of powers equivalent and parallel to those held by former Byzantine Emperor and the Tatar Khan, both known in Russian sources as Tsar. The political effect was to elevate Ivan's position". The new title not only secured the throne but also granted Ivan a new dimension of power that was intimately tied to religion. He was now a "divine" leader appointed to enact God's will, as "church texts described Old Testament kings as 'Tsars' and Christ as the Heavenly Tsar". The newly appointed title was then passed on from generation to generation, and "succeeding Muscovite rulers... benefited from the divine nature of the power of the Russian monarch... crystallized during Ivan's reign".

Domestic policy

Despite calamities triggered by the Great Fire of 1547, the early part of Ivan's reign was one of peaceful reforms and modernization. He introduced local self-government to rural regions, mainly in northeastern Russia, populated by the state peasantry.

In 1553, Ivan suffered a near-fatal illness and was thought not able to recover. While on his presumed deathbed, Ivan had asked the boyars to swear an oath of allegiance to his eldest son, an infant at the time. Many boyars refused since they deemed the tsar's health too hopeless for him to survive. This angered Ivan and added to his distrust of the boyars. There followed brutal reprisals and assassinations, including those of Metropolitan Philip and Prince Alexander Gorbatyi-Shuisky.

Ivan ordered in 1553 the establishment of the Moscow Print Yard, and the first printing press was introduced to Russia. Several religious books in Russian were printed during the 1550s and 1560s. The new technology provoked discontent among traditional scribes, which led to the Print Yard being burned in an arson attack. The first Russian printers, Ivan Fedorov and Pyotr Mstislavets, were forced to flee from Moscow to the Grand Duchy of Lithuania. Nevertheless, the printing of books resumed from 1568 onwards, with Andronik Timofeevich Nevezha and his son Ivan now heading the Print Yard.

Ivan had St. Basil's Cathedral constructed in Moscow to commemorate the seizure of Kazan. There is a legend that he was so impressed with the structure that he had the architect, Postnik Yakovlev, blinded so that he could never design anything as beautiful again. However, in reality Postnik Yakovlev went on to design more churches for Ivan and the walls of the Kazan Kremlin in the early 1560s as well as the chapel over St. Basil's grave, which was added to St. Basil's Cathedral in 1588, several years after Ivan's death. Although more than one architect was associated with that name, it is believed that the principal architect is the same person.

Other events of the period include the introduction of the first laws restricting the mobility of the peasants, which would eventually lead to serfdom and were instituted during the rule of the future Tsar Boris Godunov in 1597. (See also Serfdom in Russia.)

The combination of bad harvests, devastation brought by the oprichnina and Tatar raids, the prolonged war and overpopulation caused a severe social and economic crisis in the second half of Ivan's reign.

The 1560s brought to Russia hardships that led to a dramatic change of Ivan's policies. Russia was devastated by a combination of drought, famine, unsuccessful wars against the Polish–Lithuanian Commonwealth, Tatar invasions, and the sea-trading blockade carried out by the Swedes, the Poles, and the Hanseatic League. His first wife, Anastasia Romanovna, died in 1560, which was suspected to be a poisoning. The personal tragedy deeply hurt Ivan and is thought to have affected his personality, if not his mental health. At the same time, one of Ivan's advisors, Prince Andrei Kurbsky, defected to the Lithuanians, took command of the Lithuanian troops and devastated the Russian region of Velikiye Luki. This series of treasons made Ivan paranoically suspicious of nobility.

On 3 December 1564, Ivan departed Moscow for Aleksandrova Sloboda, where he sent two letters in which he announced his abdication because of the alleged embezzlement and treason of the aristocracy and the clergy. The boyar court was unable to rule in Ivan's absence and feared the wrath of the Muscovite citizens. A boyar envoy departed for Aleksandrova Sloboda to beg Ivan to return to the throne. Ivan agreed to return on condition of being granted absolute power. He demanded the right to condemn and execute traitors and confiscate their estates without interference from the boyar council or church.

Alexsandrova Sloboda was a separate territory within the borders of Russia, mostly in the territory of the former Novgorod Republic in the north. Ivan held exclusive power over the territory. Originally, it numbered 1000. The  were headed by Malyuta Skuratov. One known  was the German adventurer Heinrich von Staden. They owed their allegiance and status to Ivan, not heredity or local bonds.

The first wave of persecutions targeted primarily the princely clans of Russia, notably the influential families of Suzdal. Ivan executed, exiled or forcibly tonsured prominent members of the boyar clans on questionable accusations of conspiracy. Among those who were executed were the Metropolitan Philip and the prominent warlord Alexander Gorbaty-Shuisky. Of the 12,000 nobles, 570 became  and the rest were expelled.

The men "took virtually all the peasants possessed, forcing them to pay 'in one year as much as [they] used to pay in ten. This degree of oppression resulted in increasing cases of peasants fleeing, which, in turn, reduced the overall production. The price of grain increased ten-fold.

Sack of Novgorod

During the grim conditions of the epidemic, a famine and the ongoing Livonian War, Ivan grew suspicious that noblemen of the wealthy city of Novgorod were planning to defect and to place the city itself into the control of the Grand Duchy of Lithuania. A Novgorod citizen Petr Volynets warned the tsar about the alleged conspiracy, which modern historians believe to be false. The  burned and pillaged Novgorod and the surrounding villages, and the city has never regained its former prominence.

Casualty figures vary greatly from different sources. The First Pskov Chronicle estimates the number of victims at 60,000. According to the Third Novgorod Chronicle, the massacre lasted for five weeks. The massacre of Novgorod consisted of men, women and children who were tied to sleighs and run into the freezing waters of the Volkhov River, which Ivan ordered on the basis of unproved accusations of treason. He then tortured its inhabitants and killed thousands in a pogrom. The archbishop was also hunted to death. Almost every day, 500 or 600 people were killed or drowned, but the official death toll named 1,500 of Novgorod's "big" people (nobility) and mentioned only about the same number of "smaller" people. Many modern researchers estimate the number of victims to range from 2,000 to 3,000 since after the famine and epidemics of the 1560s, the population of Novgorod most likely did not exceed 10,000–20,000. Many survivors were deported elsewhere.

The  did not live long after the sack of Novgorod. During the 1571–72 Russo-Crimean War, the  failed to prove themselves worthy against a regular army.

Pretended resignation
In 1575, Ivan once again pretended to resign from his title and proclaimed Simeon Bekbulatovich, his statesman of Tatar origin, the new Grand Prince of All Rus'''. Simeon reigned as a figurehead leader for about a year. According to the English envoy Giles Fletcher, the Elder, Simeon acted under Ivan's instructions to confiscate all of the lands that belonged to monasteries, and Ivan pretended to disagree with the decision. When the throne was returned to Ivan in 1576, he returned some of the confiscated land and kept the rest.

Foreign policy
Diplomacy and trade

In 1547, Hans Schlitte, the agent of Ivan, recruited craftsmen in Germany for work in Russia. However, all of the craftsmen were arrested in Lübeck at the request of Poland and Livonia. The German merchant companies ignored the new port built by Ivan on the River Narva in 1550 and continued to deliver goods in the Baltic ports owned by Livonia. Russia remained isolated from sea trade.

Ivan established close ties with the Kingdom of England. Russian-English relations can be traced to 1551, when the Muscovy Company was formed by Richard Chancellor, Sebastian Cabot, Sir Hugh Willoughby and several London merchants. In 1553, Chancellor sailed to the White Sea and continued overland to Moscow, where he visited Ivan's court. Ivan opened up the White Sea and the port of Arkhangelsk to the company and granted it privilege of trading throughout his reign without paying the standard customs fees.

With the use of English merchants, Ivan engaged in a long correspondence with Elizabeth I of England. While the queen focused on commerce, Ivan was more interested in a military alliance. Ivan even proposed to her once, and during his troubled relations with the boyars, he even asked her for a guarantee to be granted asylum in England if his rule was jeopardised. Elizabeth agreed if he provided for himself during his stay.

Ivan corresponded with overseas Orthodox leaders. In response to a letter of Patriarch Joachim of Alexandria asking him for financial assistance for the Saint Catherine's Monastery, in the Sinai Peninsula, which had suffered by the Turks, Ivan sent in 1558 a delegation to Egypt Eyalet by Archdeacon Gennady, who, however, died in Constantinople before he could reach Egypt. From then on, the embassy was headed by Smolensk merchant Vasily Poznyakov, whose delegation visited Alexandria, Cairo and Sinai; brought the patriarch a fur coat and an icon sent by Ivan and left an interesting account of his two-and-a-half years of travels.

Ivan was the first ruler to begin cooperating with the free cossacks on a large scale. Relations were handled through the Posolsky Prikaz diplomatic department; Moscow sent them money and weapons, while tolerating their freedoms, to draw them into an alliance against the Tatars. The first evidence of cooperation surfaces in 1549 when Ivan ordered the Don Cossacks to attack Crimea.

Conquest of Kazan and Astrakhan

While Ivan was a child, armies of the Kazan Khanate repeatedly raided northeastern Russia. In the 1530s, the Crimean khan formed an offensive alliance with Safa Giray of Kazan, his relative. When Safa Giray invaded Muscovy in December 1540, the Russians used Qasim Tatars to contain him. After his advance was stalled near Murom, Safa Giray was forced to withdraw to his own borders.

The reverses undermined Safa Giray's authority in Kazan. A pro-Russian party, represented by Shahgali, gained enough popular support to make several attempts to take over the Kazan throne. In 1545, Ivan mounted an expedition to the River Volga to show his support for the pro-Russians.

In 1551, the tsar sent his envoy to the Nogai Horde, and they promised to maintain neutrality during the impending war. The Ar begs and Udmurts submitted to Russian authority as well. In 1551, the wooden fort of Sviyazhsk was transported down the Volga from Uglich all the way to Kazan. It was used as the Russian place d'armes during the decisive campaign of 1552.

On 16 June 1552, Ivan led a strong Russian army towards Kazan. The last siege of the Tatar capital commenced on 30 August. Under the supervision of Prince Alexander Gorbaty-Shuisky, the Russians used battering rams and a siege tower, undermining and 150 cannons. The Russians also had the advantage of efficient military engineers. The city's water supply was blocked and the walls were breached. Kazan finally fell on 2 October, its fortifications were razed and much of the population massacred. Many Russian prisoners and slaves were released. Ivan celebrated his victory over Kazan by building several churches with oriental features, most famously Saint Basil's Cathedral on Red Square in Moscow. The fall of Kazan was only the beginning of a series of so-called "Cheremis wars". The attempts of the Moscow government to gain a foothold on the Middle Volga kept provoking uprisings of local peoples, which was suppressed only with great difficulty. In 1557, the First Cheremis War ended, and the Bashkirs accepted Ivan's authority.

In campaigns in 1554 and 1556, Russian troops conquered the Astrakhan Khanate at the mouths of the Volga River, and the new Astrakhan fortress was built in 1558 by Ivan Vyrodkov to replace the old Tatar capital. The annexation of the Tatar khanates meant the conquest of vast territories, access to large markets and control of the entire length of the Volga River. Subjugating Muslim khanates turned Muscovy into an empire.

After his conquest of Kazan, Ivan is said to have ordered the crescent, a symbol of Islam, to be placed underneath the Christian cross on the domes of Orthodox Christian churches.

Russo-Turkish War

In 1568, Grand Vizier Sokollu Mehmet Paşa, who was the real power in the administration of the Ottoman Empire under Sultan Selim, initiated the first encounter between the Ottoman Empire and its future northern rival. The results presaged the many disasters to come. A plan to unite the Volga and Don by a canal was detailed in Constantinople. In the summer of 1569, a large force under Kasim Paşa of 1,500 Janissaries, 2,000 Sipahis and a few thousand Azaps and Akıncıs were sent to lay siege to Astrakhan and to begin the canal works while an Ottoman fleet besieged Azov.

In early 1570, Ivan's ambassadors concluded a treaty at Constantinople that restored friendly relations between the Sultan and the Tsar.

Livonian War

In 1558, Ivan launched the Livonian War in an attempt to gain access to the Baltic Sea and its major trade routes. The war ultimately proved unsuccessful and stretched on for 24 years, engaging the Kingdom of Sweden, the Grand Duchy of Lithuania, the Polish–Lithuanian Commonwealth and the Teutonic Knights of Livonia. The prolonged war had nearly destroyed the economy, and the Oprichnina had thoroughly disrupted the government. Meanwhile, the Union of Lublin had united the Grand Duchy of Lithuania and Kingdom of Poland, and the Polish-Lithuanian Commonwealth acquired an energetic leader, Stephen Báthory, who was supported by Russia's southern enemy, the Ottoman Empire. Ivan's realm was being squeezed by two of the time's great powers.

After rejecting peace proposals from his enemies, Ivan had found himself in a difficult position by 1579. The displaced refugees fleeing the war compounded the effects of the simultaneous drought, and the exacerbated war engendered epidemics causing much loss of life.

Báthory then launched a series of offensives against Muscovy in the campaign seasons of 1579–81 to try to cut the Kingdom of Livonia from Muscovy. During his first offensive in 1579, he retook Polotsk with 22,000 men. During the second, in 1580, he took Velikie Luki with a 29,000-strong force. Finally, he began the Siege of Pskov in 1581 with a 100,000-strong army. Narva, in Estonia, was reconquered by Sweden in 1581.

Unlike Sweden and Poland, Frederick II of Denmark had trouble continuing the fight against Muscovy. He came to an agreement with John III of Sweden in 1580 to transfer the Danish titles of Livonia to John III. Muscovy recognised Polish–Lithuanian control of Livonia only in 1582. After Magnus von Lyffland, the brother of Fredrick II and a former ally of Ivan, died in 1583, Poland invaded his territories in the Duchy of Courland, and Frederick II decided to sell his rights of inheritance. Except for the island of Saaremaa, Denmark had left Livonia by 1585.

Crimean raids

In the later years of Ivan's reign, the southern borders of Muscovy were disturbed by Crimean Tatars, mainly to capture slaves. (See also Slavery in the Ottoman Empire.) Khan Devlet I Giray of Crimea repeatedly raided the Moscow region. In 1571, the 40,000-strong Crimean and Turkish army launched a large-scale raid. The ongoing Livonian War made Moscow's garrison to number only 6,000 and could not even delay the Tatar approach. Unresisted, Devlet devastated unprotected towns and villages around Moscow and caused the Fire of Moscow (1571). Historians have estimated the number of casualties of the fire to be 10,000 to 80,000.

To buy peace from Devlet Giray, Ivan was forced to relinquish his claims on Astrakhan for the Crimean Khanate, but the proposed transfer was only a diplomatic maneuver and was never actually completed. The defeat angered Ivan. Between 1571 and 1572, preparations were made upon his orders. In addition to Zasechnaya cherta, innovative fortifications were set beyond the Oka River, which defined the border.

The following year, Devlet launched another raid on Moscow, now with a numerous horde, reinforced by Turkish janissaries equipped with firearms and cannons. The Russian army, led by Prince Mikhail Vorotynsky, was half the size but was experienced and supported by streltsy, equipped with modern firearms and gulyay-gorods. In addition, it was no longer artificially divided into two parts (the "oprichnina" and "zemsky"), unlike during the 1571 defeat. On 27 July, the horde broke through the defensive line along the Oka River and moved towards Moscow. The Russian troops did not have time to intercept it, but the regiment of Prince Khvorostinin vigorously attacked the Tatars from the rear. The Khan stopped only 30 km from Moscow and brought down his entire army back on the Russians, who managed to take up defense near the village of Molodi. After several days of heavy fighting, Mikhail Vorotynsky with the main part of the army flanked the Tatars and dealt a sudden blow on 2 August, and Khvorostinin made a sortie from the fortifications. The Tatars were completely defeated and fled. The next year, Ivan, who had sat out in distant Novgorod during the battle, killed Mikhail Vorotynsky.

Conquest of Siberia

During Ivan's reign, Russia started a large-scale exploration and colonization of Siberia. In 1555, shortly after the conquest of Kazan, the Siberian khan Yadegar and the Nogai Horde, under Khan Ismail, pledged their allegiance to Ivan in the hope that he would help them against their opponents. However, Yadegar failed to gather the full sum of tribute that he proposed to the tsar and so Ivan did nothing to save his inefficient vassal. In 1563, Yadegar was overthrown and killed by Khan Kuchum, who denied any tribute to Moscow.

In 1558, Ivan gave the Stroganov merchant family the patent for colonising "the abundant region along the Kama River", and, in 1574, lands over the Ural Mountains along the rivers Tura and Tobol. The family also received permission to build forts along the Ob River and the Irtysh River. Around 1577, the Stroganovs engaged the Cossack leader Yermak Timofeyevich to protect their lands from attacks of the Siberian Khan Kuchum.

In 1580, Yermak started his conquest of Siberia. With some 540 Cossacks, he started to penetrate territories that were tributary to Kuchum. Yermak pressured and persuaded the various family-based tribes to change their loyalties and to become tributaries of Russia. Some agreed voluntarily because they were offered better terms than with Kuchum, but others were forced. He also established distant forts in the newly conquered lands. The campaign was successful, and the Cossacks managed to defeat the Siberian army in the Battle of Chuvash Cape, but Yermak still needed reinforcements. He sent an envoy to Ivan the Terrible with a message that proclaimed Yermak-conquered Siberia to be part of Russia to the dismay of the Stroganovs, who had planned to keep Siberia for themselves. Ivan agreed to reinforce the Cossacks with his streltsy, but the detachment sent to Siberia died of starvation without any benefit. The Cossacks were defeated by the local peoples, Yermak died and the survivors immediately left Siberia. Only in 1586, two years after the death of Ivan, would the Russians manage to gain a foothold in Siberia by founding the city of Tyumen.

Personal life
Marriages and children

Ivan the Terrible had at least six (possibly eight) wives, although only four of them were recognised by the Church. Three of them were allegedly poisoned by his enemies or by rivaling aristocratic families who wanted to promote their daughters to be his brides. He also had 9 children.

 Confirmed marriages 
 Anastasia Romanovna (in 1547–1560, death):
 Tsarevna Anna Ivanovna (10 August 154820 July 1550)
 Tsarevna Maria Ivanovna (17 March 1551young)
 Tsarevich Dmitri Ivanovich (October 155226 June 1553)
 Tsarevich Ivan Ivanovich (28 March 155419 November 1581)
 Tsarevna Eudoxia Ivanovna (26 February 1556June 1558)
 Tsar Feodor I of Russia (31 May 15576 January 1598)
 Maria Temryukovna (in 1561–1569, death):
 Tsarevich Vasili Ivanovich (21 March 15633 May 1563)
 Marfa Sobakina (28 October – 13 November 1571, death)
 Anna Koltovskaya (in 1572, sent to monastery). This was the last of his church-authorized weddings. She was later canonized as Saint Daria (locally-venerated saint).
 Anna Vasilchikova (in 1575/76, sent to monastery)
 Maria Nagaya (from 1580), widow:
 Tsarevich Dmitri Ivanovich (19 October 158215 May 1591) He was later canonized as Saint Right-Believing Demetrius of Uglich and Moscow, tsarevich.

 Unconfirmed marriages 

 Vasilisa Melentyeva (?–1579) (existence disputed)
 Maria Dolgorukaya (1580) (existence disputed)

In 1581, Ivan beat his pregnant daughter-in-law, Yelena Sheremeteva, for wearing immodest clothing, which may have caused her to suffer a miscarriage. Upon learning of the altercation, his second son, also named Ivan, engaged in a heated argument with his father. The argument ended with the elder Ivan fatally striking his son in the head with his pointed staff. The event is depicted in the famous painting by Ilya Repin, Ivan the Terrible and his son Ivan on Friday, 16 November 1581, better known as Ivan the Terrible killing his son.

Arts
Ivan was a poet and a composer of considerable talent. His Orthodox liturgical hymn, "Stichiron No. 1 in Honor of St. Peter", and fragments of his letters were put into music by the Soviet composer Rodion Shchedrin. The recording, the first Soviet-produced CD, was released in 1988 to mark the millennium of Christianity in Russia.

Epistles
D. S. Mirsky called Ivan "a pamphleteer of genius". The letters are often the only existing source on Ivan's personality and provide crucial information on his reign, but Harvard professor Edward L. Keenan has argued that the letters are 17th-century forgeries. That contention, however, has not been widely accepted, and most other scholars, such as John Fennell and Ruslan Skrynnikov, have continued to argue for their authenticity. Recent archival discoveries of 16th-century copies of the letters strengthen the argument for their authenticity.Martin, pp. 328–29.

Religion

Ivan was a devoted follower of Christian Orthodoxy but in his own specific manner. He placed the most emphasis on defending the divine right of the ruler to unlimited power under God. Some scholars explain the sadistic and brutal deeds of Ivan the Terrible with the religious concepts of the 16th century, which included drowning and roasting people alive or torturing victims with boiling or freezing water, corresponding to the torments of hell. That was consistent with Ivan's view of being God's representative on Earth with a sacred right and duty to punish. He may also have been inspired by the model of Archangel Michael with the idea of divine punishment.

Despite the absolute prohibition of the Church for even the fourth marriage, Ivan had seven wives, and even while his seventh wife was alive, he was negotiating to marry Mary Hastings, a distant relative of Queen Elizabeth of England. Of course, polygamy was also prohibited by the Church, but Ivan planned to "put his wife away". Ivan freely interfered in church affairs by ousting Metropolitan Philip and ordering him to be killed and accusing of treason and deposing the second-oldest hierarch, Novgorod Archbishop Pimen. Many monks were tortured to death during the Massacre of Novgorod.

Ivan was somewhat tolerant of Islam, which was widespread in the territories of the conquered Tatar khanates, since he was afraid of the wrath of the Ottoman sultan. However, his anti-Semitism was so fierce that no pragmatic considerations could hold him back. For example, after the capture of Polotsk, all unconverted Jews were drowned, despite their role in the city's economy.

Death
Upon Ivan's death, the Russian throne was left to his middle son, Feodor, a weak-minded figure. Feodor died childless in 1598, which ushered in the Time of Troubles.

Appearance

Little is known about Ivan's appearance, as virtually all existing portraits were made after his death and contain uncertain amounts of artist's impression. In 1567, the ambassador Daniel Prinz von Buchau described Ivan as follows: "He is tall, stout and full of energy. His eyes are big, observing and restless. His beard is reddish-black, long and thick, but most other hairs on his head are shaved off according to the Russian habits of the time".

According to Ivan Katyryov-Rostovsky, the son-in-law of Michael I of Russia, Ivan had an unpleasant face with a long and crooked nose. He was tall and athletically built, with broad shoulders and a narrow waist.

In 1963, the graves of Ivan and his sons were excavated and examined by Soviet scientists. Chemical and structural analysis of his remains disproved earlier suggestions that Ivan suffered from syphilis or that he was poisoned by arsenic or strangled. At the time of his death, he was 178 cm tall (5 ft. 10 in.) and weighed 85–90 kg (187–198 lb.). His body was rather asymmetrical, had a large amount of osteophytes uncharacteristic of his age and contained excessive concentration of mercury. Researchers concluded that Ivan was athletically built in his youth but, in his last years, had developed various bone diseases and could barely move. They attributed the high mercury content in his body to his use of ointments to heal his joints.

Legacy

Ivan completely altered Russia's governmental structure, establishing the character of modern Russian political organisation. Ivan's creation of the Oprichnina, answerable only to him, afforded him personal protection and curtailed the traditional powers and rights of the boyars. Henceforth, Tsarist autocracy and despotism would lie at the heart of the Russian state. Ivan bypassed the Mestnichestvo system and offered positions of power to his supporters among the minor gentry. The empire's local administration combined both locally and centrally appointed officials; the system proved durable and practical and sufficiently flexible to tolerate later modification.

Ivan's expedition against Poland failed at a military level, but it helped extend Russia's trade, political and cultural links with other European states. Peter the Great built on those connections in his bid to make Russia a major European power. At Ivan's death, the empire encompassed the Caspian to the southwest and Western Siberia to the east. His southern conquests ignited several conflicts with the expansionist Turkey, whose territories were thus confined to the Balkans and the Black Sea regions.

Ivan's management of Russia's economy proved disastrous, both in his lifetime and afterward. He had inherited a government in debt, and in an effort to raise more revenue for his expansionist wars, he instituted a series of increasingly-unpopular and burdensome taxes. Successive wars drained Russia of manpower and resources and brought it "to the brink of ruin". After Ivan's death, his empire's nearly-ruined economy contributed to the decline of his own Rurik dynasty, leading to the "Time of Troubles".

 Posthumous reputation 
Ivan's notorious outbursts and autocratic whims helped characterise the position of tsar as one accountable to no earthly authority but only to God. Tsarist absolutism faced few serious challenges until the 19th century. The earliest and most influential account of his reign prior to 1917 was by the historian N.M. Karamzin, who described Ivan as a 'tormentor' of his people, particularly from 1560, though even after that date Karamzin believed there was a mix of 'good' and 'evil' in his character. In 1922, the historian Robert Wipper - who later returned to his native Latvia to avoid living under communist rule - wrote a biography that reassessed Ivan as a monarch "who loved the ordinary people" and praised his agrarian reforms.

In the 1920s, Mikhail Pokrovsky, who dominated the study of history in the Soviet Union, attributed the success of the Oprichnina to their being on the side of the small state owners and townsfolk in a decades-long class struggle against the large landowners, and downgraded Ivan's role to that of the instrument of the emerging Russian bourgeoisie. But in February 1941, the poet Boris Pasternak observantly remarked in a letter to his cousin that "the new cult, openly proselytized, is Ivan the Terrible, the Oprichnina, the brutality." Joseph Stalin, who had read Wipper's biography had decided that Soviet historians should praise the role of strong leaders, such as Ivan, Alexander Nevsky and Peter the Great, who had strengthened and expanded Russia. In post-Soviet Russia, a campaign has been run to seek the granting of sainthood to Ivan IV. but the Russian Orthodox Church opposed the idea.

A consequence was that the writer Alexei Tolstoy began work on a stage version of Ivan's life, and Sergei Eisenstein began what was to be a three part film tribute to Ivan. Both projects were personally supervised by Stalin, at a time when the Soviet Union was engaged in a war with Nazi Germany. He read the scripts of Tolstoy's play and the first of Eisenstein's films in tandem after the Battle of Kursk in 1943, praised Eisenstein's version but rejected Tolstoy's. It took Tolstoy until 1944 to write a version that satisfied the dictator. Eisenstein's success with Ivan the Terrible Part 1 was not repeated with the follow-up, The Boyar's Revolt, which angered Stalin because it portrayed a man suffering pangs of conscience. Stalin told Eisenstein: "Ivan the Terrible was very cruel. You can show that he was cruel, but you have to show why it was essential to be cruel. One of Ivan the Terrible's mistakes was that he didn't finish off the five major families." The film was suppressed until 1958.
 
The first statue of Ivan the Terrible was officially open in Oryol, Russia in 2016.  Formally, the statue was unveiled in honor of the 450th anniversary of the founding of Oryol, a Russian city of about 310,000 that was established as a fortress to defend Moscow's southern borders. Informally, there was a big political subtext. The opposition thinks that Ivan the Terrible's rehabilitation echoes of Stalin's era. The erection of the statue was vastly covered in international media like The Guardian, The Washington Post, Politico, and others.

The Russian Orthodox Church officially supported the erection of the monument.
 
Ivan was a popular character in Russian and Bulgarian folklore.
In classic Russian literature, Ivan appears in such famous works as Prince Serebrenni, The Song of the Merchant Kalashnikov, The Tsar's Bride and others.
The image of Ivan is played out in numerous operas (The Maid of Pskov, The Tsar's Bride, Ivan IV of Bizet etc.) and ballet Ivan the Terrible of Prokofiev.
 The Soviet filmmaker Sergei Eisenstein made two films based on Ivan's life and reign, Ivan the Terrible. The first part is about Ivan's early years. The second covers the period of his maturity. A third was planned but never completed.
 In Night at the Museum: Battle of the Smithsonian, Ivan the Terrible is the one the trio of henchmen that assist Kahmunrah to conquer the world, alongside Napoleon and Al Capone.
 Tsar is a 2009 Russian drama film directed by Pavel Lungin.
 Ivan the Terrible is a major character in the Soviet-era fiction comedy Ivan Vasilievich: Back to the Future, based on a play by Mikhail Bulgakov. It was one of the most popular films in the Soviet Union in 1973 and sold more than 60 million tickets.
 Ivan appears as a major character in the novel The Ringed Castle (1971), the fifth of the six novels in Dorothy Dunnett's historical fiction series, the Lymond Chronicles.
 Ivan was portrayed on BBC Radio 4 by David Threlfall in the radio play Ivan the Terrible: Absolute Power, written by Mike Walker and which was the first play in the first series of Tsar. The play was broadcast on 11 September 2016.
 A monstrous Rider version of Ivan the Terrible was depicted as a major character in the mobile game Fate Grand Order on the second chapter 'Cosmos in the Lostbelt's first story arc 'Permafrost Empire: Anastasia'. He appears as a slumbering titan and king of the human-monster hybrid locals called Yaga, forced into eternal sleep because of the sheer power of his ability to destroy his people and kept it under his rule for nearly 450 years. He later appears as a summonable character with the body of the monstrous version from the Lost Belt.
 Ivan was also portrayed in the comedic show Epic Rap Battles of History by series co-creator Nice Peter, battling against several historic figures.

See also
 Illustrated Chronicle of Ivan the Terrible
 Tsars of Russia family tree
 Tsardom of Russia, history of the Tsardom of Russia
 Crisis of the late 16th century in Russia

References

Notes

Bibliography

 
 
 
 
 

General references

 Bobrick, Benson. Ivan the Terrible. Edinburgh: Canongate Books, 1990 (hardcover). (Also published as Fearful Majesty)
 Hosking, Geoffrey. Russia and the Russians: A History. Cambridge: Harvard University Press, 2004 (paperback).
 Payne, Robert; Romanoff, Nikita. Ivan the Terrible. Lanham, Maryland: Cooper Square Press, 2002 (paperback).
 Troyat, Henri. Ivan the Terrible. New York: Buccaneer Books, 1988 (hardcover); London: Phoenix Press, 2001 (paperback).
 Ivan IV, World Book Inc, 2000. World Book Encyclopedia. 

Further reading

 
 Cherniavsky, Michael. "Ivan the Terrible as Renaissance Prince", Slavic Review, Vol. 27, No. 2. (Jun. 1968), pp. 195–211.
 Hunt, Priscilla. "Ivan IV's Personal Mythology of Kingship", Slavic Review, Vol. 52, No. 4. (Winter, 1993), pp. 769–809.
 Menken, Jules. "Ivan the Terrible." History Today (Mar 1953) 3#3, Vol. 3 Issue 3, pp. 167–73.
 Perrie, Maureen. The Image of Ivan the Terrible in Russian Folklore(Cambridge University Press, 1987).
 Perrie, Maureen. The Cult of Ivan the Terrible in Stalin's Russia. (New York: Palgrave, 2001  ).
 Platt, Kevin M.F.; Brandenberger, David. "Terribly Romantic, Terribly Progressive, or Terribly Tragic: Rehabilitating Ivan IV under I.V. Stalin", Russian Review, Vol. 58, No. 4. (Oct. 1999), pp. 635–54.
 Isolde Thyrêt, "The Royal Women of Ivan IV's Family and the Meaning of Forced Tonsure," in Anne Walthall (ed), Servants of the Dynasty: Palace Women in World History'' (Berkeley, Univ. California Press, 2008), 159–71.

External links

 The throne of Ivan the Terrible
 The holy gospel of Ivan the Terrible
 Ivan the Terrible with videos, images and translations from the Russian Archives and State Museums
 , versions of a poem by Felicia Hemans.

|-

|-

 
1530 births
1584 deaths
16th-century Grand Princes of Moscow
Antireligion
Antisemitism in Russia
Eastern Orthodox monarchs
Filicides
Folk saints
Modern child monarchs
People of the Livonian War
Rurik dynasty
Russian people of Lithuanian descent
Russian people of Serbian descent
Russian people of Tatar descent
Russian tsars